Wera may refer to:

People
Julian Wera (1902–1975), Major League Baseball third baseman
Wera Engels (1905–1988), German actress
Wera Hobhouse (born 1960), British politician
Wera Sæther (born 1945), Norwegian author

Other
Wera River, a river of Flores, Indonesia
Wera Tools, the popular name for German tool manufacturer, Wera Werk Hermann Werner GmbH & Co. KG, of Wuppertal, Germany
WERA-LP, a low-power radio station (96.7 FM) licensed to serve Arlington, Virginia, United States
 A defunct radio station in Plainfield, New Jersey on 1590 AM
WERA (Western Eastern Roadracing Association), motorcycle racing sanctioning body

See also
 Te Wera (disambiguation)